Moozhayil Sankaranarayana Temple is a temple located at Anicad, Kerala, India. This is one of the 7 Sankaranarayana temples in Kerala.

Hindu temples in Kottayam district